Good Choice and Moderates is a political party in Slovakia. The party's goals were officially announced at a press conference on 12 September 2019.

History 
In August 2019, Tomáš Drucker announced his intention to establish a new political party. Even before announcing that the party would be called Good Choice, Robert Fico responded: "He just doesn't have it. This is a typical café, liberal politician ... " Drucker responded by announcing that the request for Tibor Gašpar to remain in his position existed and was demonstrated publicly by Fico.

On 12 September 2019, they submitted almost 30,000 signatures from citizens to the Ministry of the Interior and applied for registration of the Good Choice political party. Lucia Kurilovská and Tomáš Kuča, Rector of the Academy of the Police Force, and Director of the Press and Information Department of the Government Office, became another media-famous member of the newly emerging party in September 2019. They are still listed on the party's website in February 2020:

 Michal Sýkora
 Katarína Cséfalvayová
 Branislav Becík
 Radomír Šalitroš
 Anna Ghannamová
 Peter Kresák
 Martin Fedor
 Zuzana Dolinková
 Miroslav Kočan

Election results

Surveys 
According to a survey by the AKO Agency published on September 6, 2019, the party has a potential of 23.8% and the election result would reportedly reach 7.4%. The party considers the success of the surveys to be an encouragement for further work.

On 19 September, a FOCUS survey was published, where "Good Choice" gained only 2.1%. The party did not comment further on what could have caused such a sharp decline. According to the FOCUS methodology, it was not possible to determine a 95% confidence interval.

See also 

 Politics of Slovakia
 List of political parties in Slovakia

References

External links 

 Official party website
 GOOD CHOICE in the register of parties of the Ministry of Interior of the Slovak Republic

Organizations established in 2019
Political parties in Slovakia